Norman Scott Gray (1930 – October 22, 2008) was a Canadian ice hockey player with the East York Lyndhursts. He won a silver medal at the 1954 World Ice Hockey Championships in Stockholm, Sweden.

References

1930 births
2008 deaths
Canadian ice hockey centres
East York Lyndhursts players